Antoni Nicholas Sadlak (June 13, 1908 – October 18, 1969) was a U.S. Representative from Connecticut.

Biography
Born in Rockville, Connecticut, to a Polish immigrant family, Sadlak attended the parochial school. He graduated from George Sykes Manual Training and High School in 1926 and from the Georgetown University School of Law, Washington, D.C., in 1931. He served as special inspector for the Department of Justice from July 1941 to December 1942. He served as assistant secretary-treasurer of the Farmers' Production Credit Association, Hartford, Connecticut, from 1944 to 1946. He was secretary to former Representative Boleslaus Joseph Monkiewicz in 1939, 1940, 1943, and 1944.  He served in the United States Naval Reserve in New Guinea, the Philippines, and China from March 1944 to April 1946. He was educational supervisor in the Connecticut Department of Education from July 1, 1946, to September 15, 1946.

Sadlak was elected as a Republican to the Eightieth and to the five succeeding Congresses (January 3, 1947 – January 3, 1959). Sadlak voted in favor of the Civil Rights Act of 1957. He was an unsuccessful candidate for reelection in 1958.  After his Congressional career, he served as regional assistant manager for the Veterans' Administration, Hartford, Connecticut, from March 30, 1959, to May 2, 1960. He engaged in lecturing and legislative consultation. In 1966, he was elected judge of probate for the Ellington-Vernon District and served until his death in Rockville on October 18, 1969. He was interred in St. Bernard's Cemetery.

See also

Notes

References
 Retrieved on 2009-03-02

External links

1908 births
1969 deaths
American politicians of Polish descent
United States Department of Justice lawyers
Georgetown University Law Center alumni
United States Navy personnel of World War II
People from Rockville, Connecticut
Connecticut lawyers
Republican Party members of the United States House of Representatives from Connecticut
Connecticut state court judges
20th-century American lawyers
20th-century American politicians
20th-century American judges
United States Navy reservists